Dihydrocapsaicin is a capsaicinoid and analog and congener of capsaicin in  chili peppers (Capsicum). Like capsaicin, it is an irritant. It accounts for about 22% of the total capsaicinoid mixture and has the same pungency as capsaicin. Pure dihydrocapsaicin is a lipophilic colorless odorless crystalline to waxy compound. It is soluble in dimethyl sulfoxide and 100% ethanol.

See also 

 Capsaicin
 Nordihydrocapsaicin
 Homocapsaicin
 Homodihydrocapsaicin
 Nonivamide
 Scoville scale
 Pepper spray
 Hot sauce

References

External links 
 Molecule of the Month
 Safety MSDS data

Capsaicinoids
Acetamides
Methoxy compounds